Bóbr Valley Landscape Park (Park Krajobrazowy Doliny Bobru) is a protected area in south-western Poland.

The Park lies within Lower Silesian Voivodeship: in Jelenia Góra County (Gmina Jeżów Sudecki, Gmina Stara Kamienica), Lwówek Śląski County (Gmina Lwówek Śląski, Gmina Lubomierz, Gmina Wleń) and Złotoryja County (Gmina Świerzawa).

See also
 List of Landscape Parks of Poland
 Bóbr Valley Landscape Park seen from the drone

Notes and references

External links 

Landscape parks in Poland
Parks in Lower Silesian Voivodeship